Leslie's cube is a device used in the measurement or demonstration of the variations in thermal radiation emitted from different surfaces at the same temperature.

Device
It was devised in 1804 by John Leslie (1766–1832), a Scottish mathematician and physicist.  In the version of the experiment described by John Tyndall in the late 1800s, one of the cube's vertical sides is coated with a layer of gold, another with a layer of silver, a third with a layer of copper, while the fourth side is coated with a varnish of isinglass. The cube is made from a solid block of metal with a central cavity. In use, the cavity was filled with hot water; the entire cube has essentially the same temperature as the water. The thermal detector (on the far right in the figure) showed much greater emission from the side with varnish than from any of the other three sides.

 In contemporary terms, the emissivities of shiny metals are low. Isinglass is an organic glue, and has a much larger emissivity than the metals. Leslie's cube is still in use to demonstrate and measure the variations in emissivities for different materials. In the figure, the false color images ("thermographs") of a cube at about 55 °C were taken with an infrared camera; the black and white photographs are taken with an ordinary camera. The black face of the cube is highly emissive, as indicated by the reddish color of the thermograph. The mirror-like, polished face of the aluminum cube emits thermal radiation weakly, as indicated by the blue color. The reflection of the experimenter's hand is green, which corresponds to a high emissivity surface near body temperature (37 °C). The photographs also show that the white painted surface is nearly as emissive as a black surface.

A modern version of Leslie's Cube is part of the structure of a small earth-orbiting satellite known as FUNcube-1 and registered as a Dutch spacecraft. Launched in November 2013, it demonstrates the absorption and emission of solar radiation in space as the satellite orbits in full sunlight, eclipse and rotates around its three axes.

See also
 Blackbody radiation
 Emissivity

References

Further reading

 In 1856, Draper described the device as a cubical brass vessel set upon a vertical rotatable stem. At a little distance is the blackened bulb of a differential thermometer. A mirror reflects the infrared rays of the cube onto the bulb. One of the sides of the cube is left with a clear surface, another with a coat of varnish, the third with two, and the fourth with three coats. It was found that more heat escaped as the number of coats increased. In the experiments of Macedonio Melloni, it was found that the maximum rate of radiation was at 16 coats.

Radiometry
1804 introductions
1804 in science
1804 in Scotland
Cubes